No.6 Collaborations Project is a studio album by English singer-songwriter Ed Sheeran. It was released on 12 July 2019 through Asylum and Atlantic Records. The album compiles tracks which include collaborations from Khalid, Camila Cabello, Cardi B, Chance the Rapper, PnB Rock, Stormzy, Yebba, Justin Bieber, Travis Scott, Eminem, 50 Cent, Young Thug, J Hus, Ella Mai, Paulo Londra, Dave, H.E.R., Meek Mill, A Boogie wit da Hoodie, Skrillex, Chris Stapleton, and Bruno Mars. It continues Sheeran's 2011 compilation extended play, No. 5 Collaborations Project.

Eight singles were released from No.6 Collaborations Project. Its lead single, "I Don't Care" reached atop the UK Singles Chart and reached number two on the Billboard Hot 100. Further released singles were "Cross Me", "Beautiful People", "Blow", "Best Part of Me", "Antisocial", "South of the Border", and "Take Me Back to London". Met with mixed reviews by critics, the album debuted atop the UK Albums Chart and US Billboard 200, and was nominated for Best Pop Vocal Album at the 62nd Annual Grammy Awards.

Background
Sheeran announced the album on 23 May 2019. In a post on Instagram, he said: "Before I was signed in 2011, I made an EP called No.5 Collaborations Project. Since then, I've always wanted to do another, so I started No.6 on my laptop when I was on tour last year. I'm a huge fan of all the artists I've collaborated with and it's been a lot of fun to make."

Sheeran released the album's track list on 23 May 2019, but the names of all the featured artists on the unreleased tracks were redacted. The track list includes 15 tracks, a departure from his previous three studio albums, which each consisted of 12 tracks. The track list including all guest appearances was revealed on 18 June 2019.

Release
No.6 Collaborations Project was released on 12 July 2019. The album was made available for pre-order on 23 May 2019.

Singles

The lead single of the album, "I Don't Care", a collaboration with Canadian singer Justin Bieber, was released on 10 May 2019. The song debuted and peaked at number one on the UK Singles Chart and number two on the US Billboard Hot 100.

The second single, "Cross Me", which features American rappers Chance the Rapper and PnB Rock, was released on 24 May 2019. as the album's second single. The song reached number four in the UK and number 25 on the Hot 100.

The third single, "Beautiful People", which features American singer-songwriter Khalid, was released on 28 June 2019. The song reached number one in the UK and number 13 on the Hot 100.

The dual fourth singles, "Blow", a collaboration with American singer-songwriters Chris Stapleton and Bruno Mars, and "Best Part of Me", which features American singer Yebba, were both released on 5 July 2019. The songs debuted and peaked at numbers 60 and 99 on the Hot 100, respectively.

The dual fifth singles, "Antisocial", a collaboration with American rapper and singer Travis Scott, and "South of the Border", which features Cuban-American singer Camila Cabello and American rapper Cardi B, were both released alongside the album on 12 July 2019. The latter song reached number four in the UK and both songs reached at numbers 37 and 49 on the Hot 100, respectively.

The sixth single, "Take Me Back to London", which features British rapper Stormzy, was sent to UK radio airplay on 9 August 2019. The song reached number one in the UK.

The seventh single, "Nothing on You", which features Argentine rapper Paulo Londra and British rapper Dave, was released on 8 August 2019.

The eighth and final single, "Put It All on Me", which features fellow English singer-songwriter Ella Mai, was released on 22 December 2019.

Critical reception

No. 6 Collaborations Project received mixed reviews from music critics. At Metacritic, which assigns a weighted average score out of 100 to reviews and ratings from selected mainstream critics, the album received an average of 57, based on 14 reviews, indicating "mixed or average reviews".

In a positive review, Alexis Petridis of The Guardian wrote that "unsurprisingly, the end result sounds not unlike a Top 20 rundown or Spotify's Hot Hits UK playlist" and that "Sheeran succeeds in pulling off his patent trick of simultaneously stunning you with the pitiless commercial efficiency of his writing while retaining a certain ordinary-bloke humanity," naming the album "smarm, charm and a watertight winning formula." Similarly, Neil McCormick of The Daily Telegraph says, "Sheeran has delivered a solid commercial showcase of the power of contemporary pop music brands. It is a case of Superstars Assemble. A fan base shared is a fan base multiplied." Nick Levine of NME concluded that "it's less an album, more a collection of savvy and generally savvy collaborations which blurs traditional genre boundaries unselfconsciously and acknowledges that Latin-pop is the sound of the near-future. Most of the time, it's a credit to Sheeran's songwriting skills and well-honed persona."

In a more mixed review, Helen Brown, writing for The Independent concluded that "though his fare is bland, it is sincere and hygienically prepared." Writing for Pitchfork, Rawiya Kameir opined that "few releases have been as baldly transparent and destined for ubiquity as No. 6, which has all the conspicuous mining of a Drake album, but very little of the finesse or cultural fluency" while criticizing Sheeran's rapping ability. Stephen Thomas Erlewin of AllMusic called pointed out Sheeran's "blandiness" but complimented him for knowing "that this is the sound that defines global pop in 2019" and the fact that the album was full of multiple genres. Seth Wilson of Slant Magazine felt that Sheeran spends "the entirety of the album strenuously avoiding his strengths" and that "when Sheeran trots out his bad-boy routine, his music feels ersatz." Writing for Rolling Stone, Danny Schwartz opined that "Sheeran's unobtrusively sweet voice easily slips between genres, but he struggles to connect with many of his A-list guest artists, deepening the album’s isolated mood." Malvika Padin of Clash called the record "worth a listen to catch those glimpses of experimentation" but felt that some songs "feel out of place and fail to impress despite the involvement of such acclaimed artists."

Lucy Shanker of Consequence of Sound wrote that "Sheeran has got the pop-song formula down pat" and that "he’s versatile, or at least trying to be" but that "it doesn't pay off, though, because this effort results in a sense of emptiness, an abyss of authenticity or real feeling." Writing for The New York Times, Jon Caramanica opined that "even though this record presents countless opportunities for Sheeran to fumble, there is something to be said for his choice to release it at all" but that at times "he stretches too thin." Michael Cragg of The Observer called the record "a hotchpotch of genres and guests a laser-guided exercise in streaming monopoly, a credibility-by-osmosis playlist primed for summer dominance." Writing for Variety, Chris Willman wrote that "with such an impressive friends list, you hope for at least the illusion of chemistry somewhere along the way, but it’s the ultimate Dropbox duets album" and that fans "need another set of songs as good and deeply felt as the ones that preceded this" although he did acknowledge that the album does have "less bogged down moments." In a negative review, Bernadette Giacomazzo of HipHopDX scored the album 2.5 of out five, opining that it "leaves horrible taste in one’s mouth" and that it "would go over better if Sheeran positioned this as a "pop" album rather than as a wannabe Hip Hop album," ending his review by writing "this is an experiment that could have worked — but, ultimately, didn’t."

Accolades

Year-end rankings

Commercial performance
No. 6 Collaborations Project debuted at number one on the US Billboard 200 with 173,000 album-equivalent units (AEUs), including 70,000 pure album sales. It is Sheeran's third US number-one album. In its second week, the album stayed at number one on the chart, earning 78,000 album-equivalent units of which 16,000 copies in pure albums sales. On 23 September 2019, the album was certified gold by the Recording Industry Association of America (RIAA) for combined sales and album-equivalent units of over 500,000 units.

In the UK, the album debuted at number one on the Official Albums Chart with 125,000 AEUs - making it the fastest selling album of 2019 (as of 23 July 2019). In its first week, No. 6 Collaborations Project had 57,000 physical sales, 18,000 downloads and 70.2 million track streams in the UK. This is Sheeran's fourth UK number-one album.

The album debuted at number one in other 14 countries, including Australia, New Zealand, Ireland, Taiwan, Norway, Sweden, Belgium, the Netherlands and Finland. It also debuted at number two in Italy, France and Germany.

By the end of 2019, the album had sold 1.1 million pure copies worldwide, ranking as the seventh best selling album of that year. In China the album sold with 151,502 units on Chinese music platforms, including NetEase Cloud Music, Inc.

Track listing

Notes
  signifies an additional producer.
  signifies a co-producer.
 "Blow" is stylised in all caps.

Personnel 

 Ed Sheeran – vocals , production , executive producer, guitar , bass 
 50 Cent – vocals 
 Angad "Bainz" Bains – engineering 
 AJ Putman – engineering 
 Alex Estevez – engineering 
 Alex Gibson – additional production 
 Anthony Cruz – engineering 
 Anthony Evans – editor 
 Archie Carter – assistant engineering 
 Benjy Gibson – backing vocals and percussion 
 Benny Blanco – drum programming, keyboards, and production 
 Boi-1da – production 
 A Boogie wit da Hoodie – vocals 
 Brody Brown – bass 
 Bruno Mars – drums, guitar, Moog, production, and vocals 
 Camila Cabello – vocals 
 Cardi B – vocals 
 Chance the Rapper – vocals 
 Charles Moniz – engineering 
 Chris Galland – mixing , mixing engineering 
 Chris Laws – engineering , programming 
 Chris Sclafani – engineering 
 Chris Stapleton – vocals 
 Dann Pursey – engineering 
 Dave – vocals 
 David Pizzimenti – engineering 
 Denis Kosiak – engineering 
 DJ Riggins – assistant mix engineering , engineer 
 Ella Mai – vocals 
 Emma Corby – brass arrangements 
 Eminem – vocals 
 Evan LaRay – engineering 
 Fred – ad-libs , backing vocals , bass and drums , beatbox , co-production , engineering , guitar , keyboards , production , programming , synthesizer 
 Gabe Jaskowiak – recording 
 Geoff Swan – engineering 
 George Seara – engineering 
 Georgia Gibson – saxophone 
 Gosha Usov – engineering 
 H.E.R. – vocals 
 Inaam Haq – assistant recording engineering 
 J Hus – vocals 
 Jacob "The Menace" Dennis – assistant engineering 
 Jacob Richards – assistant mix engineering , engineering 
 Jahaan Sweet – production 
 Jaime Estalella – engineering 
 Poo Bear – backing vocals 
 Jaycen Joshua – mixing 
 Joe Reeves – guitar 
 Joe Rubel – drum programming , engineering , keyboards, and production 
 Joe Strange – engineering 
 John Hanes – engineering 
 Josh Gudwin – production and recording 
 Justin Bieber – vocals 
 Kate Conklin – additional vocals 
 Kenny Beats – production 
 Khalid – vocals 
 Kid Culture – additional programming 
 Ky Miller – engineering 
 Liam Nolan – engineering 
 Luke Farnell – assistant engineering 
 Manny Marroquin – mixing 
 Mark "Spike" Stent – mixing 
 Matt Wolach – mixing 
 Max Martin – backing vocals , keyboards , producer , programming 
 Meek Mill – vocals 
 Michael Freeman – mixing 
 Michael Ilbert – engineering 
 Mike Seaberg – assistant mix engineering , engineering 
 Mike Strange – engineering and mixing 
 Nineteen85 – bass, drums, keyboards, and production 
 Ovy on the Drums – engineering 
 Paul Anthony Morrison – engineering 
 Paulo Londra – vocals 
 PnB Rock – vocals 
 Pino Palladino – bass 
 Robert Sellens – assistant engineering 
 Robin Florent – assistant mix engineering , mixing 
 Sam Tsang – synthesizer, programming, and additional production 
 Scott Desmarais – assistant mix engineering , mixing 
 Serban Ghenea – mixing 
 Shaan Singh – engineering 
 Shellback – guitar , keyboards , production, and programming 
 Simone Torres – engineering 
 Skrillex – mixing , production 
 Steve Mac – keyboards and production 
 Stormzy – vocals 
 Stuart Hawkes – mastering 
 Tate McDowell – assistant engineering 
 Doveman – keyboards 
 Tom Norris – mixing 
 Tony Campana – engineering 
 Travis Scott – engineering and vocals 
 Tre Nagella – engineering 
 Yebba – vocals 
 Young Thug – vocals

Charts

Weekly charts

Year-end charts

Certifications

Release history

References

2019 albums
Asylum Records albums
Atlantic Records albums
Collaborative albums
Ed Sheeran albums
Albums produced by Ed Sheeran
Albums produced by Max Martin
Albums produced by Shellback (record producer)
Albums produced by Benny Blanco
Albums produced by Bruno Mars
Albums produced by Steve Mac
Albums produced by Nineteen85
Albums produced by Boi-1da
Albums produced by Fred Again
Pop albums by English artists
Contemporary R&B albums by English artists
Hip hop albums by English artists